More Twisted is a 2006 collection of short stories by crime writer Jeffery Deaver. The book was published in 2006 by Simon & Schuster and is a follow up to Deaver's 2003 Twisted. More Twisted contains fifteen previously published stories together with a new Lincoln Rhyme mystery.

Stories 

 Chapter and Verse
 The Commuter
 The Westphalian Ring
 Surveillance
 Born Bad
 Interrogation
 Afraid
 Double Jeopardy
 Tunnel Girl
 Locard's Principle (an original Lincoln Rhyme story)
 A Dish Served Cold
 Copycat
 The Voyeur
 The Poker Lesson
 Ninety-eight Point Six
 A Nice Place to Visit

References 

 Deaver, Jeffery: More Twisted

External links 

 Jeffery Deaver's Official site

2006 short story collections
Works by Jeffery Deaver
American short story collections
Crime short story collections